Mamdouh bin Abdulaziz Al Saud (born 1940) is a businessman, the former governor of the Tabuk Province and a member of the Saudi royal family.

Early life
Prince Mamdouh was born in 1940. His parents are King Abdulaziz and Nouf bint Nawaf bin Nuri Al Shaalan. They married in November 1935. Nouf was a member of the Ruwala tribe based in northwestern Arabia, Transjordan and Syria. Prince Mamdouh has two full brothers; Prince Thamir and Prince Mashhur.

Career
Prince Mamdouh was the governor of Tabuk Province from 1986 to 1987. He was succeeded by Prince Fahd bin Sultan as governor. Then he served as the director of Saudi Center of Strategic Studies from 1994 to 2004. During his term as the director of Strategic Studies, Prince Mamdouh also participated in the meetings of the Consultative Council in Jeddah. He is a businessman and a member of the Allegiance Council.

Personal life
In 1961 he married Sultana bint Abdullah bin Abdulrahman Aldakhil.

Ancestry

References

External links

Mamdouh
Mamdouh
Mamdouh
Mamdouh
1940 births
Living people
Mamdouh
Mamdouh